
Year 417 BC was a year of the pre-Julian Roman calendar. At the time, it was known as the Year of the Tribunate of Tricipitinus, Lanatus, Crassus (or Cicurinus) and Axilla (or, less frequently, year 337 Ab urbe condita). The denomination 417 BC for this year has been used since the early medieval period, when the Anno Domini calendar era became the prevalent method in Europe for naming years.

Events 
 By place 
 Greece 
 Following the loss by Athens and its allies in the Battle of Mantinea, a political "tug of war" takes place in Athens. Alcibiades joins forces with Nicias against Hyperbolus, the successor of the demagogue politician Cleon as champion of the common people. Hyperbolus tries to bring about the ostracism of either Nicias or Alcibiades, but the two men combine their influence and induce the Athenian people to expel Hyperbolus instead.

Births

Deaths

References